Ryan Roose B. Garcia (born January 12, 1990) is a Filipino professional basketball player for the Phoenix Super LPG Fuel Masters of the Philippine Basketball Association (PBA). He was selected 6th overall in the 2013 PBA draft by the Barako Bull Energy Cola.

College career
Garcia played for the FEU Tamaraws of the University Athletic Association of the Philippines (UAAP) after playing for Southern City Colleges in his hometown of Zamboanga City in high school. In his stint with FEU, he was one of the team's top players and led the Tamaraws along with his backcourt partner Terrence Romeo and big man Aldrech Ramos, even winning the league's MVP award in just his sophomore season. However, he did not win a championship with the Tamaraws.

Professional career
Garcia was selected by GlobalPort Batang Pier sixth overall in the 2013 PBA draft.

On June 20, 2014, Garcia was traded to Barako Bull Energy in exchange for Keith Jensen.

On May 11, 2016, Garcia was traded to the Star Hotshots along with Rodney Brondial for two rookies Mark Cruz and Norbert Torres along with veteran Jonathan Uyloan.

On November 3, 2016, Garcia was traded to the Mahindra Floodbuster along with Alex Mallari in exchange for Aldrech Ramos & Mahindra's 2017 2nd round pick, and then Mahindra dealt RR Garcia along with Keith Agovida to the San Miguel Beermen in exchange for Ryan Araña & SMB's 2018 1st round pick.

On April 24, 2017, Garcia was traded by the San Miguel Beermen to the TNT KaTropa in exchange for Matt Ganuelas-Rosser.

PBA career statistics

As of the end of 2021 season

Season-by-season averages

|-
| align=left rowspan=2| 
| align=left | GlobalPort
| rowspan=2|32 || rowspan=2|18.9 || rowspan=2|.346 || rowspan=2|.306 || rowspan=2|.786 || rowspan=2|1.7 || rowspan=2|1.6 || rowspan=2|.3 || rowspan=2|.0 || rowspan=2|6.4
|-
| align=left | Barako Bull
|-
| align=left | 
| align=left | Barako Bull
| 36 || 25.5 || .421 || .286 || .667 || 2.7 || 1.8 || .7 || .1 || 9.7
|-
| align=left rowspan=3| 
| align=left | Barako Bull
| rowspan=3|30 || rowspan=3|29.7 || rowspan=3|.428 || rowspan=3|.338 || rowspan=3|.793 || rowspan=3|3.1 || rowspan=3|2.7 || rowspan=3|.5 || rowspan=3|.1 || rowspan=3|14.6
|-
| align=left | Phoenix
|-
| align=left | Star
|-
| align=left rowspan=2| 
| align=left | San Miguel
| rowspan=2|40 || rowspan=2|19.8 || rowspan=2|.372 || rowspan=2|.329 || rowspan=2|.836 || rowspan=2|1.8 || rowspan=2|2.2 || rowspan=2|.2 || rowspan=2|.1 || rowspan=2|8.1
|-
| align=left | TNT
|-
| align=left | 
| align=left | TNT
| 31 || 15.2 || .324 || .184 || .788 || 1.5 || 2.3 || .3 || .0 || 5.0
|-
| align=left | 
| align=left | Phoenix
| 10 || 23.5 || .440 || .276 || .333 || 2.3 || 2.0 || .4 || .3 || 7.6
|-
| align=left | 
| align=left | Phoenix
| 17 || 16.4 || .413 || .395 || .706 || 2.1 || 1.8 || .4 || .1 || 6.2
|-
| align=left | 
| align=left | Phoenix
| 25 || 17.1 || .402 || .348 || .625 || 2.1 || 2.1 || .4 || .1 || 5.6
|-class=sortbottom
| align=center colspan=2 | Career
| 223 || 20.8 || .389 || .306 || .758 || 2.1 || 2.1 || .4 || .1 || 8.0

References

1990 births
Living people
Barako Bull Energy players
Basketball players from Zamboanga del Sur
NorthPort Batang Pier players
Philippine Basketball Association All-Stars
Philippines men's national basketball team players
Filipino men's basketball players
Phoenix Super LPG Fuel Masters players
Point guards
San Miguel Beermen players
Southeast Asian Games gold medalists for the Philippines
Southeast Asian Games medalists in basketball
Sportspeople from Zamboanga City
Magnolia Hotshots players
TNT Tropang Giga players
FEU Tamaraws basketball players
Competitors at the 2011 Southeast Asian Games
Barako Bull Energy draft picks